NPSA may refer to:
National Park of American Samoa
National Pedal Sport Association, south-eastern US regional BMX sanctioning body 1974–1988
National Patient Safety Agency, part of the National Health Service of the United Kingdom
National Public Schools Association, group taking part in the National education campaign in the United Kingdom (1837–1870)
National Party South Africa
Northeastern Political Science Association